Mathieu Boogaerts (born 1970 in Fontenay-sous-Bois), is a French singer-songwriter.

Biography
The son of a pharmacist mother and antiquarian father, Mathieu spent his early childhood in Fontenay sous Bois before acquainting himself with the piano. At age ten he started playing an organ - intended for use by his mother, but who never picked it up. After two years of taking courses, he started his first musical group at age 13 with two fellow students and friends from middle school. 
After many years travelling the world, mostly Africa (especially Kenya), he started penning some naive, minimalistic ditties. 
His sketchy, intimate sound sometimes mixes African rhythms with reggae, and his influences such as the Dutch singer Dick Annegarn, with whom he toured in 1997.

His album Michel is accompanied by an amateur film made by Boogaerts himself.

His music is known for its laid-back style and many of his songs include a very light and delicate drum beat.

Discography
 1996 – Super
 1998 – J'en Ai Marre d'Être Deux
 1999 – Mathieu Boogaerts en Public (Recorded over 2 days: 11 and 12 September 1999)
 2002 – 2000
 2003 – DVD 2002 en concert solo
 2005 – Michel
 2008 – I Love You
 2012 – Mathieu Boogaerts
 2016 – Promeneur
 2021 - En Anglais

Other releases

 2005 – Plutôt tôt – Plutôt tard (Double CD by artists on the Tôt ou tard label), songs Demain demain with JP Nataf and Bombes 2 Bal, Na na na with Vincent Delerm, Les aspres with Dick Annegarn
 2006 – Le Grand Dîner (Tribute album for Dick Annegarn, with songs Les tchèques, and Bébé éléphant (duet with -M-)

References

External links
 Official site

1970 births
Living people
People from Fontenay-sous-Bois
21st-century French singers
21st-century French male singers